The 1942 Iowa Pre-Flight Seahawks football team represented the United States Navy pre-flight aviation training school at the University of Iowa as an independent during the 1942 college football season. The team compiled a 7–3 record and outscored opponents by a total of 211 to 121. The 1942 team was known for its difficult schedule, including Notre Dame, Michigan, Ohio State, Minnesota, Indiana, Nebraska, and Missouri. The team was ranked No. 2 among the service teams in a poll of 91 sports writers conducted by the Associated Press.

The Navy's pre-flight aviation training school opened on April 15, 1942, with a 27-minute ceremony during which Iowa Governor George A. Wilson turned over certain facilities at the University of Iowa to be used for the training of naval aviators. At the time, Wilson said, "We are glad it is possible to place the facilities of this university and all the force and power of the state of Iowa in a service that is today most vital to safeguarding our liberties." The first group of 600 air cadets was scheduled to arrive on May 28.

Bernie Bierman, then holding the rank of major, was placed in charge of the physical conditioning program at the school. Bieman had been the head coach of Minnesota from 1932 to 1941 and served as the head coach of the Iowa Pre-Flight team in 1942. Larry Snyder, previously the track coach at Ohio State, was assigned as Bierman's assistant.  Don Heap, Dallas Ward, Babe LeVoir, and Trevor Reese were assigned as assistant coaches for the football team.

In June 1942, Bierman addressed the "misconception" that the Iowa pre-flight school was "merely a place for varsity athletics." He said: "Our purpose here is to turn out the toughest bunch of flyers the world has ever seen and not first class athletes."

Two Seahawks were named to the 1942 All-Navy All-America football team: George Svendsen at center and Dick Fisher at left halfback. In addition, Bill Kolens (right tackle), Judd Ringer (right end), George Benson (quarterback), and Bill Schatzer (left halfback) were named to the 1942 All-Navy Preflight Cadet All-America team.

Schedule

Roster

References

Iowa Pre-Flight
Iowa Pre-Flight Seahawks football seasons
Iowa Pre-Flight Seahawks football